Cochisea recisa is a species of geometrid moth in the family Geometridae. It is found in North America.

The MONA or Hodges number for Cochisea recisa is 6648.

References

Further reading

 

Bistonini
Articles created by Qbugbot
Moths described in 1975